The Kaiser Permanente Building, also known as the Lloyd 500 Building, is a 16-story building located at 500 Northeast Multnomah Street in Portland, Oregon's Lloyd District, in the United States. Construction began in 1972 and was completed in 1974.

See also
Kaiser Permanente

References

1974 establishments in Oregon
Buildings and structures completed in 1974
Lloyd District, Portland, Oregon
Northeast Portland, Oregon
Skyscrapers in Portland, Oregon